Route 655 is a  long mostly east–west secondary highway in the southwestern portion of New Brunswick, Canada. Most of the route is in New Maryland Parish.

The route starts at Route 101 in Nasonworth where it crosses the Oromocto River and travels southeast through Rusagonis-Waasis. The route continues to cross Route 2 and Route 7 while running along the east bank of the Oromocto River. Route 655 ends between Oromocto and Lincoln at Route 102 close to the Fredericton International Airport.

History

See also

References

655
655